George Bobolas is a Greek construction and media businessman.

Biography
Bobolas has developed properties all over the Balkans, Europe and the Near East for over four decades. He is also a media magnate owning the Greek TV Mega Channel and several magazines and newspapers, part of Attiki Odos, 49% of the Parnitha Casino and gold mines in Italy and Greece. He has 5.62% of the voting rights of Pegasus Publishing S.A, which is listed on the Athens Stock Exchange.

References

Living people
1928 births
Greek businesspeople